Logger may refer to:

 Lumberjack, a woodcutter, a person who harvests lumber
 Data logger, software that records sequential data to a log file
 Keystroke logger, software that records the keys struck on a computer keyboard
 logger, a command line utility that can send messages to the syslog

See also
 Logbook
 Logging
 Lager—beer